Daniel James McLoyd (born July 30, 1994), better known as IceJJFish, is an American internet personality, singer, rapper, and dancer known for his vocals and his song "On the Floor", which has reached over 85 million views on YouTube as of June 2022. The popularity that he gained from the song's virality led to him becoming an internet sensation and being featured in various TV shows and internet podcasts. The attention that his music received led to him being comically labeled as the "King of R&B" and a meme by various notable figures and outlets. In 2019, he decided to pursue gospel music, due to it reflecting the style of music that he wanted to make. He has officially released three studio albums, three EPs, and three commercial singles.

Life and career
In his teenage years, IceJJFish attended Waubonsie Valley High School in Aurora, Illinois. Then in his twenties, IceJJFish gained popularity through social media sites, such as YouTube and Instagram. In December 2011, he uploaded his first video "Back That Ass Up". It was followed by his first recorded song, "Higher than an Airplane" that same year. He uploaded two more videos the next year.

On November 25, 2013, IceJJFish released his debut single, "On the Floor". He released its music video on February 6, 2014, via YouTube. The video was produced and promoted by San Antonio-based entertainment company ThatRaw.com. "On the Floor" marked his breakthrough success in his career; its video received over 10 million views within a month and currently has over 85 million views. His unique style of poorly crafted music garnered him several titles from media outlets that year, such as "internet idol" and "internet sensation". It also led to his single "On the Floor" to be regarded as one of the worst songs of the 2010s.

In 2014, IceJJFish made a guest appearance in Odd Future's Loiter Squad. In the episode he was included in, he created a song alongside Tyler, the Creator that was meant to troll hip hop. The song was titled "I Just Bought A Bugatti (I'm Happy)" and was applauded by critics for its humorous nature.

Later in 2015, IceJJFish would be featured in an episode of Nick Cannon's Wild N' Out. In the episode, he was involved in a rap competition with the show's regulars.

In the second half of the 2010s, IceJJFish would go on to feud with artists such as Lil Yachty, accusing musicians like him of copying his sound.  He would go on to release an EP titled LilJJFish as a result, with its cover featuring McLoyd mimicking Yachty's appearance. IceJJFish then later went on to change his R&B sound to that of gospel, with the projects he released in 2019 reflecting that sound.

On October 5, 2022, IceJJFish announced on social media that he had gotten married.

He currently spreads his Christian beliefs on social media and continues to make gospel music.

Discography

Studio albums

EPs

Singles
 "On the Floor" (2013)
 "Get Lost" (2017)
 "My Bae" (2017)

References 

1994 births
Living people
Internet memes
People from Aurora, Illinois
Outsider musicians
African-American male rappers
Midwest hip hop musicians
Christians from Illinois
21st-century African-American male singers
American gospel singers
American contemporary R&B singers
American Internet celebrities